The Kelana Jaya line extension is an extension of one of the Klang Valley LRT lines completed in 2016. It is 17 km in length from Kelana Jaya to Putra Heights.

History
The extensions of the LRT Kelana Jaya Line and Ampang and Sri Petaling Lines (formerly known as PUTRA and STAR LRT respectively), to USJ and Puchong respectively and converging at Putra Heights were proposed simultaneously by the government in 2006. The extension is named as LRT Extension Project (LEP) and will be part of a RM10 billion plan to expand Kuala Lumpur's public transport network.

As of August 2008, Syarikat Prasarana Negara Berhad (SPNB, now known as Prasarana Malaysia) was reportedly running land and engineering studies for the proposed extension.

In September 2009, SPNB began displaying the alignment of the proposed extensions over a 3-month period for feedback. The Kelana Jaya extension will see 13 new stations over 17 km from Kelana Jaya to Putra Heights. Construction is expected to commence in early 2010.

In November 2010, Prasarana announced that it has awarded RM1.7 billion for first phase of the project. The winners include Trans Resource Corp Bhd for the Kelana Jaya line extension. UEM Builders Bhd and Intria Bina Sdn Bhd were appointed as subcontractors for the fabrication and supply of segmental box girder jobs for the Kelana Jaya line. Phase 1 for the extension was to be from Kelana Jaya via the depot to The Summit (now USJ 7) while Phase 2 is from The Summit to Putra Heights.

Construction works on the Kelana Jaya line extension project are targeted to accelerate at the end of March 2011, with commencement of structural works, subject to approval from state government and local authorities. By April 2014, the 17.4 km LEP was more than two thirds completed. 12 stations with seven having park-and-ride facilities will be on the extension.

Opening
The extension was opened on 30 June 2016, together with the final part of the Sri Petaling line extension from Bandar Puteri to Putra Heights, with stations at:
Lembah Subang
Ara Damansara
CGC - Glenmarie
Subang Jaya
SS15
SS18
USJ 7
Taipan
Wawasan
USJ21
Alam Megah
Subang Alam
Putra Heights
The line was officially inaugurated by Prime Minister Najib Tun Razak in the afternoon but the line was operational since 6am. The fare is based on the journey length itself, where the fare increases when the distance travelled increases.

Services and rolling stock
The extension was to have train services from Gombak, alternating between Ara Damansara and Putra Heights as the terminus. Therefore, peak hours frequencies were 20 trains per hour (tph) between Gombak and Ara Damansara and 10tph between Ara Damansara and Putra Heights. This service was in place until the Klang Valley Additional Vehicle (KLAV) were brought into service in 2017.

The fleet serving the line remain the same, which are served by 35 2-coach articulated Bombardier Innovia Metro ART 200, 35 4-coach articulated ART 200 trains and the KLAV.

Infrastructure
As part of a green initiative, station staff recruited on the extension will adopt green practices. Energy-efficient lights are installed at every station which have rainwater harvesting systems. Windows were designed to allow sunlight to penetrate into the station. During construction, recycling was done and sustainable materials are used.

Developments
The extension has boosted developments at stations along the line. Transit-oriented development (TOD) were focused in Subang Jaya and USJ and more street lamps were installed to increase safety.

Notes and references

Notes

References

Rapid transit in Malaysia